"El Capitan" is the second single by American hip hop band OPM. The original version was featured on their debut studio album, Menace to Sobriety. It went on to chart at number 20 on the UK Singles Top 40. It was written about the band's favorite rum. The song was also remixed by Damien Mendis and Stuart Bradbury of SoulChild. It was re-recorded in 2012 for the Heaven Can Wait EP.

Music video
Directed by Spencer Susser (who also directed the "Stash Up" video). It shows the band showing up to the aftermath of a massive house party with teens passed out and hungover in every room of the house. It shows a woman waking up to puke in a toilet and the explicit version shows a male urinating in a sink at the end of the video.

Formats and track listings
CD maxi
"El Capitan" (Soulchild remix) – 3:31
"El Capitan" (album version) – 3:25
"Undercover Freak" (007 version) – 3:28

UK CD single, promo
"El Capitan" (Soulchild radio remix) (clean) – 3:31

CD single, promo
"El Capitan" (Soulchild remix) (dirty) – 3:31
"El Capitan" (Soulchild remix) (clean) – 3:31

Charts

References

2000 songs
2001 singles
Atlantic Records singles
OPM (band) songs